Wainstein is a surname. Notable people with the surname include:

Jules Wainstein, reality television personality on The Real Housewives of New York City
Kenneth L. Wainstein (born 1962), American lawyer
Leo Wainstein (1883–1978), Ukrainian-born Italian jurist and businessman

See also
Weinstein